Torre Angela is a station of Line C of the Rome Metro. It is located near Via Casilina, at the intersection of Viale Duilio Cambellotti and Largo Ettore Paratore. The station serves the Roman quarters Torre Angela, Tor Vergata and Tor Bella Monaca. The previous train station of the Rome–Pantano railway line closed in  2008 in order to be transformed into the current metro station. It was re-opened on 9 November 2014.

External links

Rome Metro Line C stations
Railway stations opened in 2014
2014 establishments in Italy
Railway stations in Italy opened in the 21st century